The Gaza Triad refers collectively to Aeneas of Gaza, Procopius of Gaza and Zacharias Scholasticus. The three were sixth century Christian theologians from Gaza. Aeneas (died c. 518) was a Christian neo-platonist who defended the Christian doctrine of the resurrection against pagan attacks. Procopius (465-528) wrote biblical commentaries in catena form. Zacharius (died c. 540) was a philosopher and early church historian.

References

Matthew Bunson, editor. Encyclopedia of Catholic History, article on Aeneas of Gaza

Further reading
 Aeneas of Gaza, Theophrastus, transl. by John Dillon and Donald Russell. With Zacharias of Mytilene, Ammonius, transl. by Sebastian Gertz, coll. Ancient commentators on Aristotle, London, Bristol Classical Press, 2012.
 Downey, R. (1963). Gaza in the Sixth Century. Norman, OK: University of Oklahoma Press.

External links
Asceticism and Christological Controversy in Fifth Century Palestine by Cornelia B. Horn.

Eastern Orthodox theologians